Hamilabad (also Romanized as Ḩamīlābād; also known as Jamīlābād) is a village in Kamal Rud Rural District, Qolqol Rud District, Tuyserkan County, Hamadan Province, Iran. At the 2006 census, its population was 262, in 65 families.

References 

Populated places in Tuyserkan County